Mount Kiaraberes-Gagak or Mount Perbakti-Gagak is the westernmost  volcano on Java island. It is an eroded stratovolcano with fumarolic areas on its flanks.

See also 

 List of volcanoes in Indonesia

References 

Stratovolcanoes of Indonesia
Volcanoes of West Java
Holocene stratovolcanoes